Pontia occidentalis, the western white, is a butterfly in the family Pieridae. It is found in Western North America.

The wingspan is 38 to 53 millimeters. The host plants are from the mustard or cabbage family, Brassicaceae. The caterpillars eat especially the flowers, buds and fruit. In the north of the range, one generation flies in June and July; in the south two generations fly from May to August.

External links
 Butterflies and Moths of North-America

occidentalis
Butterflies of North America
Fauna of California
Fauna of the California chaparral and woodlands
Butterflies described in 1866
Taxa named by Tryon Reakirt